Doc Watson on Stage (sub-titled featuring Merle Watson) is the title of a live recording by American folk music artist Doc Watson, released in 1971. It was originally released as a double LP and contained many previously unreleased titles.

It was re-released on CD by Vanguard in 1990 minus the Hank Snow track 11, "Movin' On" included on the original release.

Reception

Writing for Allmusic, music critic Matthew Greenwald called the album "One of Doc Watson's finest later records" and wrote "His feel and command of the instrument is truly incredible... A timeless slice from one of the fathers of modern country music."

Track listing
 "Brown's Ferry Blues" (Traditional) – 2:43
 "The Wreck of the 1262" (Traditional) – 3:13
 "Spikedriver Blues" (Mississippi John Hurt) – 3:02
 "Deep River Blues" (Traditional) – 3:39
 "Life Gits Teejus Don't It" (Carson Robison) – 4:36
 "Lost John" (Traditional) – 3:32
 "Hold the Woodpile Down" (Bob Johnson) – 2:58
 "Billy in the Low Ground" (Instrumental) – 1:46
 "I Am a Pilgrim" (Traditional) – 2:42
 "The Clouds Are Gwine to Roll Away" (Carson Robison) – 2:51
 "Movin' On" (melody by Hank Snow, parody lyrics written by Homer & Jethro) - 2:15 (not on the CD)
 "Windy and Warm" (John D. Loudermilk) (Instrumental) – 2:32
 "Doc's Guitar" (Doc Watson) (Instrumental) – 1:35
 "Open Up Them Pearly Gates for Me" (Traditional) – 3:11
 "The Preacher and the Bicycle" (Traditional Folk Tale) – 1:28
 "Jimmy's Texas Blues" (Jimmie Rodgers) – 3:47
 "Banks of the Ohio" (Traditional) – 3:45
 "Roll On Buddy" (Traditional) – 3:04
 "Southbound" (by Merle & Doc Watson) – 3:16
 "Wabash Cannonball" (Traditional) – 3:07
 "When the Work's All Done This Fall" (Traditional) – 3:42
 "Little Sadie" (Traditional) – 2:37
 "The Quaker's Cow" (Traditional Folk Tale) – 1:38
 "Salt River/Bill Cheatham" (Instrumental) – 2:38
 "Don't Let Your Deal Go Down" (Traditional) – 4:08

Personnel
Doc Watson – guitar, harmonica, vocals, banjo
Merle Watson – guitar
Production notes
Jack Lothrop – producer
Ed Friedner – engineer

References

External links
  Doc Watson discography

1971 live albums
Doc Watson live albums
Vanguard Records live albums
Albums recorded at the Town Hall